A list of Dutch chefs. Chefs who have held or hold Michelin starred restaurants are marked with a star.

Jerry Bastiaan 
Ron Blaauw 
Joop Braakhekke
Vincent la Chapelle
Gert-Jan Cieremans 
François Geurds  /  
Cees Helder 
Sergio Herman 
Ida Kleijnen 
Erik van Loo 
Mario Uva 
Mario Ridder  
Michel van Riswijk  
Jeroen Robberegt 
Jankees Roggeveen
Henk Savelberg 
Angélique Schmeinck 
Cas Spijkers 
Rudolph van Veen
Paul van Waarden
Hans van Wolde

References

 
Chef